The siege of Constantinople in 626 by the Sassanid Persians and Avars, aided by large numbers of allied Slavs, ended in a strategic victory for the Byzantines. The failure of the siege saved the empire from collapse, and, combined with other victories achieved by Emperor Heraclius (r. 610–641) the previous year and in 627, enabled Byzantium to regain its territories and end the destructive Roman–Persian Wars by enforcing a treaty with borders status quo c. 590.

Background

In 602, Phocas overthrew Emperor Maurice (r. 582–602). According to the later sources, his reign was marked by atrocities and administrative incompetence. The new emperor's mismanagement left the Byzantine Empire vulnerable and unstable when the Sassanid king Khosrau II (r. 590–628) invaded, using the coup as a pretext for war as Khosrau II was personally close to Maurice, who helped him return his throne after Bahram Chobin's revolt. Initially, the Sassanid invasion was successful, with the Byzantines being driven into the Anatolian heartland. Later, Phocas was overthrown by the son of the then Exarch of Carthage, Heraclius. Heraclius started active warfare and personally led his army into the battle, but the situation deteriorated and the Byzantine empire lost all its Near East possessions along with Egypt. Despite several counter-offensives into Mesopotamia, Heraclius was unable to stop his Persian enemies from laying siege to his capital where from Chalcedon they were able to launch their attack. From 14–15 May 626, riots in Constantinople against John Seismos occurred because he wanted to cancel the bread rations of the scholae or imperial guards and raise the cost of bread from 3 to 8 follis. He did this to conserve government resources, but he was removed. However, there were further disturbances in the city.

Siege

Khosrau, seeing that a decisive counterattack was needed to defeat the Byzantines, recruited two new armies from all the able men, including foreigners. Shahin was entrusted with 50,000 men and stayed in Mesopotamia and Armenia to prevent Heraclius from invading Persia; a smaller army under Shahrbaraz slipped through Heraclius' flanks and bee-lined for Chalcedon across the Bosphorus from Constantinople. Khosrau also coordinated with the Khagan of the Avars so as to launch a coordinated attack on Constantinople from both European and Asiatic sides. The Persian army stationed themselves at Chalcedon, while the Avars placed themselves on the European side of Constantinople and probably destroyed the Aqueduct of Valens. Because of the Byzantine navy's control of the Bosphorus strait, however, the Persians could not send troops to the European side to aid their ally. This reduced the effectiveness of the siege, because the Persians were experts in siege warfare. Furthermore, the Persians and Avars had difficulties communicating across the guarded Bosphorus—though undoubtedly, there was some communication between the two forces.

The defense of Constantinople was under the command of Patriarch Sergius and the patrician Bonus. Upon hearing the news, Heraclius split his army into three parts; although he judged that the capital was relatively safe, he still sent some reinforcements to Constantinople to boost the morale of the defenders. Another part of the army was under the command of his brother Theodore and was sent to deal with Shahin, while the third and smallest part would remain under his own control, intending to raid the Persian heartland.

On 29 June 626, a coordinated assault on the walls began. Inside the walls, some 12,000 well-trained Byzantine cavalry troops (presumably dismounted) defended the city against the forces of some 80,000 Avars and Sclaveni (Slavs, then submitted to Avars), who were determined to remove all Roman imperial rule over Europe. However, it was only when the Avars began moving forward heavy siege equipment towards the Theodosian Walls that their intention to lay a siege became clear. Despite continuous bombardment for a month, morale was high inside the walls of Constantinople because of Patriarch Sergius' religious fervor and his processions along the wall with an icon, which could be the icon of the Virgin Mary, inspiring the belief that the Byzantines were under divine protection. Furthermore, the patriarch's cries for religious zeal among the peasantry around Constantinople was made ever more effective by the fact that they were facing heathens. Consequently, every assault became a doomed effort. When the Avar-Slavic fleet and the Persian fleet were sunk in two different naval engagements, the attackers panicked and fled, abandoning the siege, apparently under the belief that divine intervention had won the day for Byzantium.

On 7 August, a fleet of Persian rafts ferrying troops across the Bosphorus were surrounded and destroyed by Byzantine ships. The Slavs under the Avars attempted to attack the sea walls from across the Golden Horn, while the main Avar host attacked the land walls. Patrician Bonus' galleys rammed and destroyed the Slavic boats; the Avar land assault from 6 August to the 7th also failed. With the news that Theodore had decisively triumphed over Shahin (supposedly leading Shahin to die from depression), the Avars retreated to the Balkan hinterland within two days, never to seriously threaten Constantinople again. Even though the army of Shahrbaraz was still encamped at Chalcedon, the threat to Constantinople was over. In thanks for the lifting of the siege and the supposed divine protection of the Virgin Mary, a new proemium for the celebrated Akathist Hymn was written by an unknown author, possibly Patriarch Sergius or George of Pisidia.

Aftermath

The loss in the siege came just after news had reached them of yet another Byzantine victory, where Heraclius's brother Theodore scored well against the Persian general Shahin. Furthermore, after the emperor showed Shahrbaraz intercepted letters from Khosrau ordering the Persian general's death, the latter switched to Heraclius' side. Shahrbaraz then moved his army to northern Syria, where he could easily decide to support either Khosrau or Heraclius at a moment's notice. Still, with the neutralization of Khosrau's most skilled general, Heraclius deprived his enemy of some of his best and most experienced troops, while securing his flanks prior to his invasion of Persia. In the next year, Heraclius led an invasion into Mesopotamia once again, defeating another Persian army at Nineveh. Afterwards, he marched on to Ctesiphon where anarchy reigned allowing Heraclius to extract ever more favorable terms as one Persian king was overthrown by another. Eventually, the Persians were obliged to withdraw all armed forces and return Egypt, the Levant and whatever imperial territories of Mesopotamia and Armenia were in Roman hands at the time of an earlier peace treaty in c. 595. The war was over; neither the Persians nor the Byzantines would cross swords again until the Arab-Islamic invasion broke the power of both empires.

Assessment
The siege of 626 failed because the Avars did not have the patience or technology to conquer the city. Though the Persians were experts in siege warfare, the walls of Constantinople proved to defend easily against the siege towers and engines, amongst the reasons being that the former could not move their siege equipment to the European side of the Bosphorus (which was heavily guarded), where their Avar and Slavic allies were initially stationed. Furthermore, the Persians and Slavs did not have a strong enough navy to ignore the sea walls and establish a channel of communication. The lack of supplies for the Avars eventually caused them to abandon the siege.

See also
Bonus
Byzantine-Sassanid Wars
Siege of Constantinople (674)

References

Sources

Further reading

External links 
 

626
Constantinople 626
Constantinople 626
Constantinople 626
626
620s in the Byzantine Empire
Constantinople
Avar–Byzantine wars
620s in the Sasanian Empire
Constantinople 626